Les Vraies Housewives (translated The Real Housewives and  abbreviated LVH) was a French reality television show that aired on NT1 on March 18, 2013 until April 1, 2013. Developed as an international installment of the Real Housewives franchise, it aired only one season and documented the personal and professional lives of several French women residing in Beverly Hills, California.

Overview and casting

The series premiered on March 18, 2013 with a cast of five women: Soumaya Akaaboune, Christina Amrani, Karine Kaplan, Christine Snider-Decroix, and Natalie Wizman. 
During its airing, the French press was very critical of the programme and referred to the series as a "mirror of stupidity."

The series was not subsequently renewed and remained a one season series.

The 10 year anniversary of the show was on March 18, 2023.

References

External links
 

2010s French television series
2013 French television series debuts
2013 French television series endings
French-language television shows
Television shows set in Beverly Hills, California
The Real Housewives
French television series based on American television series
Women in California